Shadiabad may refer to:
 Shadiabad, Kerman
 Shadiabad, Kurdistan